Meggy MacIntosh is a children's historical novel by Elizabeth Janet Gray. Beginning in 1775, it follows the story of a young Scottish orphan who becomes involved with the American revolutionary cause in North Carolina despite her attachment to Flora MacDonald, a loyalist. The novel, illustrated by Marguerite de Angeli, was first published in 1930 and was a Newbery Honor recipient in 1931.

References 

1930 American novels
Children's historical novels
American children's novels
Newbery Honor-winning works
Novels set in North Carolina
Novels set during the American Revolutionary War
Novels about orphans
1930 children's books